Liebenwerda is a Verbandsgemeinde ("collective municipality") in the district of Elbe-Elster, in Brandenburg, Germany. Its seat is in Bad Liebenwerda. It was established in January 2020.

The Verbandsgemeinde Liebenwerda consists of the following municipalities:
Bad Liebenwerda
Falkenberg/Elster
Mühlberg
Uebigau-Wahrenbrück

Demography

References

Verbandsgemeinden in Brandenburg
Elbe-Elster